is a Japanese manga series written and illustrated by Mizuho Kusanagi. It has been serialized in Hakusensha's shōjo manga magazine Hana to Yume since August 2009, with its chapters collected in forty tankōbon volumes as of January 2023.

A 24-episode anime television series adaptation produced by Pierrot aired between October 2014 and March 2015.

Plot
2000 years ago, the fictional nation of Kouka was founded by the Crimson Dragon God, who came down to Earth from the Heavens as a human, deemed the Crimson Dragon King. It was believed that humans were living in an era full of evil and thirst for power, where they forgot about the Gods. The Crimson Dragon King was eventually forced to fight against these humans, and just as he was about to be killed and the world was on the brink of extinction, four other Dragon Gods, imbued with the dragon blood, joined his side as human warriors, and helped him lead Kouka to prosperity. After they had cleared Kouka of evil, the Crimson Dragon King died. The four Dragon warriors mourned his death and walked separate ways from his castle, leaving the country to develop over the centuries into 5 Tribes: Sky, Earth, Water, Wind, and Fire. As countless generations flew by, this history became a famous founding myth.

2000 years later, the story commences with Yona, the sole princess of Kouka, ruled by her pacifistic father King Il under the Sky Tribe. Yona lives a lavish, sheltered life from the harrowing reality outside of the walls of the Crimson Dragon Castle, protected by her bodyguard Hak, general of the Wind Tribe, and often visited by Soo-won, her crush of 10 years and the son of King Il's brother, Yoo-hon. But contrary to this peaceful illusion, Kouka is once again on the verge of destruction and about to undergo a political upheaval.

A week before a party celebrating her sixteenth birthday, Soo-won visits to pay tribute to her. Upon revealing her intention to someday marry him to her father, Yona is shocked and dismayed when King Il pointedly forbids her from choosing Soo-won as a husband. On the night of her 16th birthday party, Yona visits her father's chambers again, determined to change his mind. Instead, she walks in on Soo-won driving a sword through King Il's chest, revealing that he'd planned a Coup d'état and would become Kouka's next King. Yona and Hak become fugitives and are forced to flee to Fuuga, the capital of the Wind Tribe. Under the suggestion of Hak's adopted grandfather and prior Wind Tribe General Son Mundok, Yona and Hak search for an exiled priest who tells her about the Crimson Dragon King and four Dragon warriors who unified the nation. Guided by this seemingly fictitious myth, Yona begins a journey to find these warriors in order to survive and save her country.

Characters

Main characters

Yona is the only princess of Kouka and only child of pacifistic King Il. She is of Sky Tribe descent. Having rare red hair and violet eyes, Yona is the reincarnation of the Crimson Dragon King. As the reincarnation, the four legendary dragon Gods' blood will react to her soul the moment they lay eyes on her, and they will keep to the original Dragon Warrior's oath to protect and fight alongside her. According to King Il, Yona's mother, Queen Kashi, was killed by insurgents when she was 6 years old, but this was later revealed to be a lie; his brother Yu-Hon, had killed her mother. Sheltered in the Crimson Dragon Castle, Yona was very dependent, spoiled, and naive. She was not allowed to touch weapons, nor brought up politically aware, as King Il had never allowed her to see the world outside the castle walls. She spent her days with her childhood friends Soo-won and Hak. From an early age, she secretly harbored romantic affections for Soo-won, but her father opposed her from marrying him. After Soo-won staged a coup to seemingly murder the king, Yona, who accidentally witnessed the aftermath of the scene, was forced to flee. With Min-Soo distracting those in pursuit and his timely self-sacrifice, Yona was able to flee with Hak to the Wind Tribe. Instead of hiding in the Wind Tribe, she decided to journey around Kouka to find the Dragon warriors mentioned in the exiled priest Ik-soo's prophecy. After opening her eyes to the ruined state of Kouka, she acknowledged and took responsibility for her past ignorance. Losing her father, her castle, her throne, and the man she loved in just one night pushed Yona into vowing to become stronger to protect herself, her allies, and eventually her country during travel in secret.
Yona asked Hak to teach her archery and sword fighting. While initially reluctant to kill humans and animals as according to her father's pacifistic ideals, Yona eventually overcame this hesitation against Kum-Ji, the human trafficking crime lord of Port Awa. Although Yona cannot forgive Soo-won, she still came across a few moments when she found herself not wanting to kill him, or still caring about him somewhere in her heart. After realizing that he genuinely cared for her and Hak and is a genuinely good - possibly even better - King than Il, a part of her now wishes to understand him and his motives better. Initially, she wished for revenge, but later realized that toppling Soo-won off the throne would only plunge Kouka into chaos, and that living a life fueled by hatred was not the answer. Over time, she moves past her previous affections for Soo-won and develops new romantic feelings for Hak. She resolves to someday release Hak of his role as her bodyguard, and return his freedom to him so that he can live out his life in whichever way he wants.

He is Yona's childhood best friend and bodyguard, as well as the former general of the Wind Tribe. He is known as the "Lightning Beast" for his astounding lightning-fast fighting skills, earning him the title of the strongest soldier in the Kingdom of Kouka, though he is not very famous outside the Sky and Wind Tribes. His talent had already been recognized since he was thirteen years old and he was the first person to defeat a general in combat at such a young age. He was orphaned as a toddler and was adopted by the previous Wind Tribe general, Son Mundok, as his grandson and heir. He was falsely rumored to be the murderer of King Il and to have kidnapped Yona, due to them disappearing from the palace the night of the king's death without public explanation.
Hak is usually sarcastic and nonchalant, often found teasing Yona, but secretly loved Yona from a young age and vowed to protect her on King Il's orders at all costs. He considered Soo-won his best friend before his betrayal, looking up to him as a brother. However, knowing that Yona had feelings for Soo-won, Hak suppressed his own feelings in favor of Yona and Soo-won living happily together. He vowed to be Soo-won's right-hand man if Soo-won were to marry Yona and become king, and had resolved himself to serving them both for the rest of his life. Being a deeply loyal and straight-forward person, he was severely hurt by Soo-won's betrayal and has arguably had a harder time coming to terms with it than Yona. Originally extremely overprotective of Yona, he later grows out of it when he sees her determination to become stronger and begins taking pride in her fiery side. In combat, Hak uses a guandao (a glaive-like bladed pole weapon) as his main weapon, though he also appears to be highly proficient with bows, swords, and hand-to-hand combat.

He is an orphan boy who was taken in by the priest, Ik-soo, as an apprentice when he was a child. Because of his cute face and expertise at cooking and making medicine, he is often mistaken for a girl, or teased for this skill set. He found Yona and Hak when they fell from the cliff after being attacked by Tae-Jun's ambush. He initially disliked Yona for being an ignorant princess, but later apologized after witnessing Yona's bravery and willingness to educate herself. His initial hatred for nobles stemmed from the fact that Ik-soo was banished from the kingdom by Soo-won's father, and from his own impoverished childhood. He always dreamed of going on a journey so that he could learn more about medicine and the world, but never did so before due to the fact that he did not want to leave Ik-soo. After some convincing, Yoon decided to leave and start traveling with Yona and Hak. Once the Four Dragons are assembled, he becomes something of a medic and caretaker for the group and harbours a close, sibling-like relationship with Yona. He is the only true non-combatant in the group, though he is capable of making explosives.

Yona's cousin and first love, he is the son of King Il's brother, Yu-Hon, and currently Kouka's 11th King of the Sky Tribe. Growing up, he was close childhood friends with Yona and Hak, loving Yona like a younger sister and Hak as an elder brother. In the wake of Yona's mother Kashi's death, Soo-won comforted Yona and promised to be by her side in her mother's place, which largely contributed to her falling in love with him. He was also Hak's best friend and confidant for many years, and the two of them learned spearmanship and archery under Mundok, as well as greatly admired each other as children. When around others, Soo-won maintains a facade of being a clumsy and carefree young man, hiding his true intelligence and shrewdness. After his father was killed by Il, who ruled for 10 years and caused Kouka Kingdom to suffer under his pacifism, Soo-won conspired with the Fire Tribe to kill him and take over the throne. With King Il dead, Yona missing and presumed dead, and Hak presumed to have killed them both and on the run as a criminal, Soo-won is crowned the King of Kouka and vows to recreate it into a country that never relies on gods. Even though he hated King Il and declared he will dispose of anyone who gets in his way, Soo-won still cares for both Yona and Hak. He hides the fact that Yona is still alive from his followers after he discovers this, and pointedly avoids arresting or attacking Hak when given the opportunity. Despite the underhanded method he chose to gain the throne, he has actually been a good influence on Kouka; hence, Yona decides she does not want to seek revenge against him. Although he does not wish to sacrifice individuals, he is prepared to make sacrifices in order to uphold the stability of the country. Later on, he is revealed by Zeno to have inherited an incurable disease from his mother, Yon-Hi, due to being a descendant of Hiryuu. This illness had an overwhelming influence in forming his arguably atheist outlook and hatred of religion.

Dragon Warriors

The descendant and inheritor of the White Dragon's claw. Kija spent most of his life isolated in his hidden village whose people venerated him. He is naive and gullible, with a crippling fear of bugs. Out of all four dragons, Kija was the most immediately loyal to Yona, having been raised on the tale of Hiryuu and possessing a strong sense of duty as the White Dragon. As all the previous White Dragons were raised much the same as he was and bore the same eagerness to serve Hiryuu, Kija is the unknowing vessel of the departed spirits of several generations of White Dragons. His father—the previous generation's White Dragon—was so upset that a new dragon had been born, he slashed Kija across the back shortly after his birth. As such, he was kept away from Kija until the moment he died and Kija still bears the scars across his back well into adulthood. Originally, he often bickered with Hak, believing that an outsider has no place protecting Hiryuu's reincarnation and taking offence to Hak's "White Snake" nickname for him. However, as time went on, they develop respect, trust, and friendship over their mutual desire to protect Yona. He also harbours a small crush on Yona, but instead actively chooses not to interfere with her growing affections for Hak. Kija wields his dragon claw in combat, which grows massive in size and is said to be able to cut through anything. When not in combat, he wraps his claw in a bandage to avoid attracting attention. Along with Zeno, Jae-ha, and Shin-ah, he has a secondary ability to manifest a shield to protect Yona in dire situations.

The descendant and inheritor of the Blue Dragon's eyes. In contrast to Kija's people, Shin-ah's village feared the inheritors of the Blue Dragon's powers, believing them to be cursed. This fear was so extreme that when Shin-ah was born, his mother killed herself. Because the villagers believe that those who look the dragon in the eyes will turn into stone, Shin-ah had a lonely childhood and thus, grew very quiet and socially awkward. He was raised to age 4 by the previous Blue Dragon, Ao, who taught him swordsmanship and his duty to protect the village. Soon after Ao's death, Shin-ah used the power of his eyes to protect his village from approaching bandits, killing all of them. This forced the entire clan to flee their old village and move into their hidden mountain dwelling, within which Yona, Yoon, Hak and Kija later meet him several years in the future. Despite initial hesitance to join her, he saves Yona from a malicious villager and eventually chooses to leave the village with her. While growing up, Shin-ah was referred to only as the Blue Dragon and did not have a name, and thus Yona named him "Shin-ah", meaning "moonlight" in the language of Kouka. Shin-ah is able to see great distances, manifest horrifying hallucinations and induce heart attacks to those he uses his eyes on. After using his dragon ability, however, Shin-ah's body becomes paralyzed for a short time.
To avoid making eye contact, Shin-ah covers his face with a mask, though he later takes to wearing a blindfold to avoid the attention his mask attracts. Eventually, he grows comfortable enough with the rest of the group that he only covers his eyes in public. Shin-ah is usually accompanied by his pet squirrel, Ao, named after the previous Blue Dragon. He is extremely loyal to Yona, due to her being one of the first people to be kind towards him since the death of his predecessor. He is also particularly close to Zeno, and the two are often seen playing or spending time together. He mainly wields a sword in battle, choosing not to use his powers for anything other than as a last resort. Along with Zeno, Jae-ha and Kija, he has a secondary ability to manifest a shield to protect Yona in dire situations.

The descendant and inheritor of the Green Dragon's right leg. Jae-Ha was kept prisoner in his village until he eventually escaped and joined a pirate crew in Awa. Sensing their presence when they arrive in Awa, Jae-Ha tries to avoid Yona and the White and Blue Dragons because he did not want to be constrained by his duty, and he initially declines Yona's invitation to join her. However, he is intrigued by Yona's spirit and determination, and despite his concerns that his dragon blood is influencing his feelings, he leaves the pirate crew and joins Yona on her journey. Jae-Ha is laid back, flamboyant, and a womanizer, but is also observant and wiser due to his older age and experiences. He is aware of Hak's feelings for Yona and likes to tease him about it, much to Hak's frequent annoyance. Despite his earlier reservations about joining them, Jae-Ha eventually becomes a surrogate older brother to the group, and develops a close friendship with Hak—who only ever refers to him as "Tareme", often translated to "Droopy Eyes". He harbours some romantic affection toward Yona himself, but chooses not to pursue her due to their age gap and out of respect for Hak and the obvious feelings Yona holds for him. Jae-Ha has infinite strength in his dragon leg, which allows him to kick hard enough to shatter armour and jump far enough that he appears to fly. He can enlarge his leg as Kija does his hand, however, prefers not to do so since he dislikes the look of it. Jae-Ha mainly utilizes his powerful leg for close combat and throws daggers as long-range weapons. Along with Zeno, Shin-ah, and Kija, he has a secondary ability to manifest a shield to protect Yona in dire situations.

The Yellow Dragon warrior. In contrast to the other dragon warriors, Yona did not have to go searching for him as he wandered into their camp. Zeno is cheerful and upbeat, and is usually smiling—behaviours adopted from his late wife, Kaya. Seemingly carefree, Zeno is actually the most observant of the group, quickly catching notice of anything unusual. It is revealed that Zeno is the original Yellow Dragon Warrior who served King Hiryuu (making him about two thousand years old) and that he has been following Yona ever since she fled the castle. He also visited the young Dragon Warriors when Yona was born, which is only very vaguely recalled by Kija, who was four at the time. Zeno admits that, unlike the other three dragons, he did not sense any 'awakening' when he first saw Yona and does not initially show any special abilities. Zeno's dragon power is immortality; his body regenerates, even if he is beheaded or burned alive. When he uses this power, dragon scales cover his body and he becomes as strong as the White Dragon and can jump as high as the Green Dragon. Zeno used to live in Hiryuu palace and functioned as Kouka's first Priest, but he was forced to leave when the public started to notice that he did not age. Zeno usually wields a shield in combat to protect Yoon and Yona from projectile attacks. He reserves his power for a last resort, as it does entail him having to be gravely wounded to take effect. Along with Shin-ah, Jae-ha and Kija, he has a secondary ability to manifest a shield to protect Yona in dire situations.

Others

He is a clumsy High Priest and Oracle of the Kouka Kingdom and was Yoon's guardian. He spends his days in isolation praying to the gods for guidance and for the happiness of the people. He reveals a prophecy to Yona that marks the start of her search for the Four Dragon Warriors.

He is the general of the Earth Tribe and the husband of Yoon-Ho. He serves under Soo-won's rule after acknowledging Soo-won's strength during the Battle Game Festival held in Chi'shin. As a general who fought during Emperor Joo-nam’s era (Yona and Soo-won's grandfather), he is a warrior dedicated to the battlefield and has been eager to fight on the front lines again. His tribe admires him, though he insists on them treating him like an ordinary citizen.

He is the former General and leader of the Wind Tribe. He is the adoptive grandfather of Hak. Before his retirement, he was known as a general whose strength was compared to General Yu-Hon’s. Despite his strict behavior and appearance, Mundok cares deeply for the Wind Tribe and the royal family, to whom he is quite loyal. He has a kind heart and adopted two orphans as his grandchildren: Hak and Tae-Yeon.

Tae-jun is the second son of the Fire Tribe General Kan Soo-jin. He was determined to make Yona his wife initially only to inherit the throne of Kouka Kingdom, though it is revealed after he mistakenly believes that she is dead that he genuinely liked her. Because of Hak intervening in his brash attempts to court Yona for years, he harbors a vendetta against Hak and actively tries to have him killed after Hak and Yona escaped the castle. During his pursuit, he inadvertently caused both of them to fall from a cliff, leading Tae-jun to believe that he had killed Yona. This left Tae-jun heavily depressed and guilty over the ordeal for months. He is finally reunited with Yona when his brother assigned him to capture bandits said to be driving off Fire Tribe soldiers from collecting taxes — which was really Yona and her group defending the poor from being abused by the military. Due to his extreme happiness that Yona is alive, Tae-jun fully repented his actions and resolved to change the lives of the Fire Tribe's people, earning him respect from his subordinates and Yona herself. He later remains a valuable ally to Yona and her group from that point onward, even agreeing to risk treason at her request.

Lili is the only daughter of Water Tribe General An Joon-gi. She is a confident, spunky girl around Yona's age with big ambitions to help solve the overwhelming drug problems that plague the Water Tribe. However, her efforts are impaired by her overly-protective father with whom she shares a distant, strained relationship. She initially thought that Yona and her group were suspicious, and thus involved in the drug trade. However, upon shadowing Yona's group for a few hours and being saved by them when attacked by a drug addict, she comes to realize that they share a common goal. With the combined efforts of herself, Yona's group, and an incognito Soo-won, they are successfully able to arrest the reigning drug lord in the Water Tribe. Lili and Yona's group team up once again after this to quell the Water Tribe's drug and slave trade in Kai (a neighbouring nation), resulting in Lili and Yona being kidnapped by the enemy and sold as slaves in retribution for their drug-ban efforts. They eventually break out from the slave camp, but Lili is caught once again and sent to be hanged. She is rescued in the knick of time by Lili's personal guards and Yona's group, aided by from Soo-won's and Joon-Gi's forces—most notably, a joint effort between Hak and Soo-won. Her near-death experience and her anti-drug trade efforts resulted in Lili gaining strong respect from the people of the Water Tribe.
From that point onward, Lili becomes a common ally between Yona and Soo-won. She boasts a close friendship and loyalty to Yona, but also a blooming camaraderie with Soo-won, along with a deep gratitude for his role in her rescue. She is one of the few characters outside of Yona's companions who, not knowing her before her father's death, is privy to Yona's true identity as the true heir to the Kouka throne. She is also considered a valid marriage option for Soo-won by her father and some of the other generals of Kouka, though much to her distaste, as she has a crush on the much admired General Geun-tae. She is a neutral party in the conflict between Soo-won and Yona, but has publicly announced her friendship and loyalty to Yona to thousands of Sky Tribe and Water Tribe troops.

Media

Manga

Written and illustrated by Mizuho Kusanagi, Yona of the Dawn started in Hakusensha's shōjo manga magazine Hana to Yume on August 5, 2009. Hakusensha has collected its chapters into individual tankōbon volumes. The first volume was released on January 19, 2010. As of January 20, 2023, forty volumes have been released.

The series has been licensed for English release in North America by Viz Media, who announced the acquisition at their New York Comic Con panel in October 2015. The first volume was released on August 2, 2016. As of October 4, 2022, thirty-seven volumes have been released.

Anime

A 24-episode anime television series adaptation produced by Pierrot aired between October 7, 2014, and March 24, 2015, on AT-X. Funimation has licensed the anime series for streaming and home video rights in North America. Beginning on March 17, 2015, Funimation streamed their dubbed version of the anime, starting with episode 13 while the first half of the season will be released at a later date. The first opening theme is an instrumental song by Kunihiko Ryo, called . The second opening theme is "Akatsuki no Hana", by Cyntia. The second ending theme is "Akatsuki", by Akiko Shikata. Three original video animations were bundled with the manga's 19th, 21st and 22nd limited edition volumes, respectively. The first OVA was released on September 18, 2015, the second OVA was released on August 19, 2016, and the third OVA was released on December 20, 2016.

See also
 The Heroic Legend of Arslan, a long-running novel series with a similar premise.

Notes

References

External links
  
  
 

Adventure anime and manga
Anime series based on manga
Coming-of-age anime and manga
Funimation
Hakusensha franchises
Hakusensha manga
High fantasy anime and manga
Pierrot (company)
Romance anime and manga
Shōjo manga
Tokyo MX original programming
Viz Media manga